Antognazza is an Italian surname. Notable people with the surname include:

 Emiliano Albín Antognazza (born 1989), Uruguayan footballer
 Maria Rosa Antognazza (born 1964), English professor of philosophy

See also

Carlos Antognazzi

Italian-language surnames